Elfriede Zimmermann (born 1908, date of death unknown) was a German swimmer. She competed in the women's 200 metre breaststroke event at the 1928 Summer Olympics.

References

External links
 

1908 births
Year of death missing
German female swimmers
Olympic swimmers of Germany
Swimmers at the 1928 Summer Olympics
Swimmers from Berlin
German female breaststroke swimmers